Nathaniel Webb  (1725–1786) was a West Indies plantation owner and British politician who sat in the House of Commons between  1768 and 1780.
 
Webb was the second son  of Nathaniel Webb and his wife Bethiah Gerrish, daughter of William Gerrish of Montserrat, and was baptized on 21 August 1725. His father was collector of customs at Montserrat. He was possibly educated at  Eton College in 1742. In 1741 he inherited his father's West Indian plantations. He married Elizabeth Nanton on 2 December 1747. In 1765 he inherited the family property in Taunton from his brother Robert.
     
In the  1768 general election Webb was returned unopposed as Member of Parliament for Taunton. He was supported by local tradesmen who formed an association in the  Market House Society. He then gave £2,000 for the new market house. He stood again at Taunton in the 1774 general election  with the support of Lord North, who was then recorder of Taunton. He was returned after an expensive contest but was unseated on petition on 16 March 1775. He successfully contested  Ilchester at a by-election on 14 December 1775. He did not stand again in 1780. He is not recorded as having spoken in Parliament.

Webb died in November 1786.

References

1725 births
1786 deaths
British MPs 1768–1774
British MPs 1774–1780
Members of the Parliament of Great Britain for English constituencies